θ Pavonis, Latinized as Theta Pavonis, is a single star in the southern constellation of Pavo. It is just visible to the naked eye as a dim, white-hued star, having an apparent visual magnitude of 5.71. This star is located 213 light years from the Sun based on parallax.

This object is an A-type main-sequence star with a stellar classification of A8V, which indicates it is generating energy through hydrogen fusion at its core. It displays little to no detectable X-ray emission, suggesting a weak corona and, at best, a shallow convection zone. Theta Pavonis is 425 million years old and is spinning rapidly with a projected rotational velocity of 245 km/s. The star has 1.56 times the mass of the Sun and 2.51 times the Sun's radius. It is radiating 17.4 times the luminosity of the Sun from its photosphere at an effective temperature of 7,453 K.

It lies six arc-minutes north of the barred lenticular galaxy NGC 6684.

References

A-type main-sequence stars
Pavo (constellation)
Pavonis, Theta
Durchmusterung objects
173168
092294
7036